Eero Rafael Roine (10 February 1904 – 8 June 1966) was a Finnish actor. He had a long career on stage and also appeared in several films. Actress Eila Roine is Eero Roine's daughter.

Selected filmography 
 Tukkijoella (1937)
 Ihmiset suviyössä (1948)
 Kipparikvartetti (1952)
 Opri (1954)
 Kuu on vaarallinen (1962)

References

External links 
 

1904 births
1966 deaths
Finnish male television actors
20th-century Finnish male actors